The Washington Post Writers Group (WPWG), a division of The Washington Post News Service & Syndicate, is a press syndication service composed of opinion journalists, editorial cartoonists, comic strips and columnists. The service is operated by The Washington Post.

The Writers Group provides syndicated columns, editorial cartoons, features, and comic strips to newspapers, magazines, and other subscribers globally. The Writers Group also offers The Washington Post News Service with Bloomberg News, which provides up to 150 national and international stories plus photos and graphics.

History
The Washington Post Writers Group formed in 1973.

Writers
Writers syndicated by the group include Eugene Robinson, Kathleen Parker, E. J. Dionne, George Will, and Ruth Marcus. The late Charles Krauthammer was also a syndicate member.

Comic strips
The syndicate began distributing comic strips in 1980 with Berkeley Breathed's Bloom County. Long-running strips distributed by the service include Brian Crane's Pickles (1990–present), Dave Blazek's Loose Parts (1991–present), and Darrin Bell's Rudy Park (2001–present) & Candorville (2003-present). As of 2018, the service syndicates eight comic strips to newspapers nationwide and abroad.

Current comic strips 
Barney & Clyde by Gene Weingarten, Dan Weingarten, and David Clark (launched in 2010)
Candorville by Darrin Bell (launched in 2003)
Fort Knox by Paul Jon Boscacci (launched in 2009)
Loose Parts by Dave Blazek (launched in 1999)
Mike du Jour by Mike Lester (launched in 2012)
Pickles by Brian Crane (launched in 1990)
 Reply All and Reply All Lite by Donna A. Lewis (launched February 28, 2011)

Former comic strips 
 12:01 by Thomas Boldt (May 1999–c. 1999)
Bloom County by Berkeley Breathed (1980–1989)
Home and Away by Steve Sicula (2003–2015)
Little Dog Lost by Steve Boreman (March 26, 2007–July 24, 2016)
 Middle Ages by Ron Jaudon (January 7, 1985–December 10, 1985) — originally (from November 12 1984) self-syndicated
 Out of the Gene Pool / Single and Looking by Matt Janz (2001–2008)
Outland by Berkeley Breathed (1989-1995)
Opus by Berkeley Breathed (2003–2008)
 Red and Rover by Brian Basset (2000–2010; moved to Universal Uclick, where it continues to the present)
Rudy Park by Darrin Bell (c. 2011–2018; acquired from United Features Syndicate, where it launched in 2001)
 Safe Havens by Bill Holbrook (1988–1992; moved to King Features Syndicate, where it continues to the present)
 Stitches by Jeff Danziger (April 1997–c. 1998)
Watch Your Head by Cory Thomas (2006–2014)

See also 
 Los Angeles Times-Washington Post News Service

References

External links
 

The Washington Post
Comic strip syndicates
News agencies based in the United States
Organizations established in 1973 
1973 establishments in the United States